Amărăștii may refer to one of two communes in Dolj County, Romania:

Amărăștii de Jos
Amărăștii de Sus